No Sleep Tonight may refer to:
"No Sleep Tonight" (The Faders song), 2005
"No Sleep Tonight" (Enter Shikari song), 2009